Margaret Atwood: Once in August is a 1984 documentary about Canadian writer Margaret Atwood, directed by Michael Rubbo and produced by the National Film Board of Canada (NFB). The film was made in Rubbo's style of self-conscious documentary filmmaking or metafilm.

Story
The film follows Rubbo's efforts to uncover the secrets of Atwood's past, only to be frustrated when the author's life fails to provide any biographical clues for her work. Atwood deflects Rubbo's autobiographical questioning with relative ease, while offering no evidence that her work can be interpreted according to her personal life. In one sequence, Atwood mocks Rubbo's planned narrative trajectory when she and her family take control of the camera. Atwood puts a paper bag over her head as family members take turns asking "who is this woman?", providing humorous responses and poking fun at Rubbo's filmmaking approach.

The following year, Rubbo released a 30-minute film entitled Atwood and Family.

Reception
The Canadian Film Encyclopedia called the film "unconvincing," stating that it "put an end to his remarkable run of personal documentaries. There is an unmistakable sense in the Atwood film that Rubbo had exhausted the form. Atwood remained distant, and Rubbo never really made contact with her as a subject."

References

External links
Margaret Atwood: Once in August at the National Film Board of Canada website

Documentary films about women writers
Margaret Atwood
1984 films
1984 documentary films
National Film Board of Canada documentaries
Films directed by Michael Rubbo
Self-reflexive films
1980s English-language films
1980s Canadian films